Mgr. Adrianus Djajasepoetra, SJ (Perfected Spelling: Adrianus Jayaseputra; 12 March 1894 – 10 July 1979), was an Indonesian Roman Catholic prelate who served as the Vicar Apostolic of Jakarta and later its Archbishop (1953–1970). Before being a Vicar Apostolic, Mgr. Adrianus was a Rector of St. Ignatius College, Yogyakarta and the 4th Rector of Major Seminary, Kentungan, Yogyakarta (1948-1949).

Life

Djajasepoetra was born in Yogyakarta in the Dutch East Indies on 12 March 1894. He studied theology in the Netherlands in 1919 just five years after the first Indonesian student. Djajasepoetra was known for supporting the Dutch missionaries who had endured much to bring Roman Catholicism to him and Indonesia. Djajasepoetra was possibly the second successful Javanese student to follow this route into the priesthood. He was ordained a priest in the Society of Jesus in 1928. Whilst still a young priest, Adrianus served at the Kota Baru and Pugeran Church in his home town of Yogyakarta. He was imprisoned by the Japanese at the Cipinang prison and Sukamiskin prison during the Second World War from 1943 to 1945.

Mgr. Adrianus was appointed Titular Bishop of Trisipa on 23 April 1953 by Pope Pius XII and consecrated by Apostolic Nuncio George-Marie de Jonghe D'Ardoye, with co-consecrator Mgr. Albertus Soegijapranata of Semarang and Mgr. Pierre Martin Arntz of Bandung. The most important event that happened in this period is the annexation of Diocese of Bogor to the Apostolic Prefect of Sukabumi and the territory was elevated to the Archdiocese of Djakarta.

The social politic circumstances in Indonesia made a serious impact on his leadership. Mgr. Adrianus strongly opposed the intrigue of the Guided Democracy era. In addition, inside the church there was a dramatic change after the Second Vatican Council that started to redefine the Roman Catholic church. Adrianus was a Council Father at the Second Vatican Council.

Mgr. Adrianus at the age of 76, requested his retirement to the Pope from his position as the Archbishop of Jakarta. He was appointed Titular Archbishop of Volsinium until his retirement on 10 July 1976.
After being retired as the Archbishop of Jakarta, Mgr. Adrianus spent the rest of his life in Wisma Emmaus Girisonta, Ungaran. Djajasepoetra died at Semarang on 10 July 1979.

References

External links

1894 births
1979 deaths
20th-century Roman Catholic archbishops in Indonesia
Indonesian Jesuits
Clergy in World War II
Javanese people
People from Yogyakarta
Jesuit archbishops